Joseph Warren (1741–1775) was an American soldier and doctor.

Joseph Warren may also refer to:

Joseph A. Warren (1882–1929), New York City Police Commissioner
Joseph M. Warren (1813–1896), U.S. Representative from New York
Joseph Warren (music editor) (1804–1881), English musician and composer
Joseph Warren (Mississippi politician) (born 1952), member of the Mississippi House of Representatives
Giuseppe Vari (1924–1993), Italian film director, sometimes credited as Joseph Warren

See also
Joe Warren (disambiguation)